The Federal Joint Committee (German: Gemeinsamer Bundesausschuss) refers to a group of German public health agencies that were merged in 2004,  under an independent chairman. It is authorized to make binding regulations growing out of health reform bills passed by lawmakers, along with routine decisions regarding healthcare in Germany.

Although the committee is not a subordinate agency and is independent of the Ministry of Health, government officials are responsible for exercising legal supervision over the committee's decisions and guidelines. As a supreme decision-making body, the Committee exerts a direct influence on the healthcare provisions for millions of people.

History 

The Federal Joint Committee (G-BA) was formed in 2004 by the merger of the following organizations

 Bundesausschuss der Ärzte und Krankenkassen (Federal committee of Physicians and Health Insurers)
 Bundesausschuss der Zahnärzte und Krankenkassen(Federal committee of Dentists and Health Insurers)
 Koordinierungsausschuss (Federal coordination committee)
 Ausschuss Krankenhaus (Hospital committee)

These organizations had been created several decades ago to ensure supervision of the professional relationship between doctors and health insurers. Their roots can be partially traced back to the Weimar Republic in the late-1910s and 1920s. 
In 2004, they were renamed and merged into the Federal Joint Committee (G-BA) as follows:

 Kassenärztliche Bundesvereinigung und Kassenzahnärztliche Bundesvereinigung (National Associations of Statutory Health Insurance Physicians and Dentists) 
 Deutsche Krankenhausgesellschaft (German Hospital Federation)
 GKV-Spitzenverband (Central Federal Association of Health Insurance Funds)

As a supreme decision-making body, the Joint Committee exerts a direct influence on the healthcare provisions for millions of people.

Decision-making process 

In the early stages of the Committee 's decision-making process, assessment reports of diagnostic or therapeutic interventions are prepared by the Institute for Quality and Efficiency in Health Care on behalf of the committee. All resolutions and guidelines passed by the Federal Joint Committee are subsequently audited by the Ministry of Health.

The directives issued by the committee are legally binding for publicly insured persons as well as for the providers and payers of health care. In total, healthcare provisions for 70 million people, excluding those who are privately insured, are determined by the committee.

Notable guidelines 

Following the German acupuncture trials from 2002 to 2006, the Committee decided to include acupuncture into the catalogue of services covered by statutory health insurance organizations for the treatment of low back pain and knee pain.

On June 17, 2010, the Committee removed the usage of glinides from general prescription guidelines for the reduction of human glucose levels. It justified its decision by referring to the conclusion of the Institute for Quality and Efficiency in Health Care that proof of efficacy was lacking.

In 2013, the Committee issued a preliminary decision ruling that a fixed dose combination of Stribild does not offer a benefit over Atripla for HIV treatment.

See also 
 German Medical Association

References

External links 
 Official homepage

Medical and health organisations based in Berlin